Jean Justin René Thomas  (20 August 1865 in Breux-sur-Avre – 20 July 1925) was a French sport shooter who competed in the late 19th century and early 20th century. He participated in Shooting at the 1900 Summer Olympics in Paris and won a bronze medal with the military rifle team.

References

External links
 
René Thomas' profile at Geneanet 

1865 births
1925 deaths
French male sport shooters
Olympic bronze medalists for France
Olympic shooters of France
Shooters at the 1900 Summer Olympics
Sportspeople from Eure
Olympic medalists in shooting
Medalists at the 1900 Summer Olympics
Place of death missing